Shapur "Sakanshah" was a Sasanian prince who served as the governor of Sakastan under his brother king (shah) Shapur II (r. 309–379).

Biography 
Shapur served as the governor of Sakastan–a province far away from the imperial court in Ctesiphon, and had since its conquest by Ardashir I, served as a difficult area for the Sasanians to maintain control over. As a result, the province had since its early days functioned as a form of vassal kingdom, ruled by princes from the Sasanian family, who held the title of sakanshah ("king of the Saka"). Although native Sakastani soldiers had helped Shapur II in his wars against the Romans, they were probably mercenaries, and the province still remained relatively decentralized. In 311, while Shapur was travelling from Sakastan to Istakhr, a city in Pars, he stopped at the ruins of the ancient Achaemenid capital of Persepolis, and had an inscription carved at the Tachara, the former palace of Darius the Great.

References

Sources
 

 
 

4th-century Iranian people
Sasanian princes
Sasanian governors of Sakastan
4th-century deaths
Shapur II